This is a list of notable  Marathi theatre actors.

A

 Anand Abhyankar
 Ankush Choudhary
 Ashok Saraf
 Avinash Masurekar

B 

 Sunil Barve
 Bharat Jadhav

D

 Dada Kondke
 Bal Dhuri

G

 Vikram Gokhale

J

 Jabbar Patel (when young)

K

 Kashinath Ghanekar
 Macchindra Kambli
 Kedar Shinde

L

Laxmikant Berde
Kavita Lad

N

 Nana Patekar

P

 Dilip Prabhavalkar

S

 Sayaji Shinde

References

Actors in Marathi theatre
Lists of theatre actors